Mr. Sebastian and the Negro Magician is a novel published in 2007 by Daniel Wallace. It was adapted for the stage in 2013 by Shane Morgan of Rough House Theatre under the title Henry Walker and the Wheel of Death. The four night run was at the Rondo Theatre in Bath.

External links
Review of the novel
Henry Walker and the Wheel of Death review from the Bath Chronicle
Henry Walker and the Wheel of Death review from The Good Review
Henry Walker and the Wheel of Death review from whatsonstage.com

2007 American novels
Doubleday (publisher) books